The Village Defence Party (VDPs) is a law enforcement force in Bangladesh, organised in distinct units at the level of individual villages and urban towns. It is administered by the Home Ministry of the central Government of Bangladesh. Although domestic security is its main objective, the Village Defence Parties are also specifically charged with working on village development and welfare schemes.

History
The Village Defence Party system was created by Ziaur Rahman, the late President of Bangladesh in 1976 as part of his "self-sufficient village government plan." The equivalent of the VDP for small towns is the "Town Defence Party." After Zia's assassination in 1981, the VDPs became less prominent, but its role in local development was re-emphasized as part of President Hussain Muhammad Ershad's decentralisation policy. In 1988, the total numbers participating in VDPs across the nation stood at 10 million.

Organisation
The current strength of the Village Defence Parties is 5.6 million, of whom 50 percent are women. Each VDP unit is uniquely organised with equal numbers of men and women. For every village, there is one platoon of men and a platoon of women. Similarly, there is one platoon of men and another of women in every ward of metropolitan cities in Bangladesh. At union level command channel, there is one male and one female Union Leader in each Union. The director general of the Bangladesh Ansar is also the chief of the Village Defence Party. The post is currently held by Major General AKM Aminul Haque.

References

Law enforcement in Bangladesh
1976 establishments in Bangladesh